South East Cork, a division of County Cork, was a parliamentary constituency  in Ireland, represented in the Parliament of the United Kingdom. From 1885 to 1922 it returned one Member of Parliament (MP) to the House of Commons of the United Kingdom of Great Britain and Ireland.

Until the 1885 general election the area was part of the Cork County constituency. From 1922, on the establishment of the Irish Free State, it was not represented in the UK Parliament.

Boundaries
This constituency comprised the south-eastern part of County Cork, consisting of the baronies of Courceys, Kerrycurrihy, Kinalea, Kinalmeaky and Kinsale, that part of the barony of East Carbery, East Division not contained within the constituency of South Cork, and that part of the barony of Ibane and Barryroe contained within the parishes of Abbeymahon, Desert, Donaghmore, Kilsillagh, Lislee, Templeomalus, Templequinlan and Timoleague, and the townland of Ahidelake in the parish of Island.

Members of Parliament

Elections

Elections in the 1880s

Elections in the 1890s

Morrogh resigned to pursue business interests in South Africa (he was a director of De Beers) and because of disagreements with John Dillon and William O'Brien.

Elections in the 1900s

Elections in the 1910s

References

Westminster constituencies in County Cork (historic)
Constituencies of the Parliament of the United Kingdom established in 1885
Constituencies of the Parliament of the United Kingdom disestablished in 1922
Dáil constituencies in the Republic of Ireland (historic)